is a private university in Narashino, Chiba, Japan.

The school was founded in 1942 in Machida, Tokyo. In 1946 it was relocated to Kimitsu, Chiba, adopted the present name at the same time. Four years later, it was moved to the present location. It is the oldest private technical university in Japan.

CIT was conceived as a central educational institution of Greater East Asia Co-Prosperity Sphere. During the Second World War, the professor at CIT was involved in the development of Nakajima Kikka．

History 

The meaning of Kōa means that Asia wakes up. Japanese government issued a permission of the establishment on December 7, 1941(December 8 Asia time). Kōa Institute of Technology was founded by  Prince Naruhiko Higashikuni, Osami Nagano, Kuniyoshi Obara, Minoru Tōgō, Kotaro Honda, Hidetsugu Yagi, Shigenao Konishi, Yuzuru Hiraga, Nobuteru Mori (Mori Konzern founder･See also Shōwa Denkō), Satoru Mori (Son Nobuteru Mori), Kitaro Nishida, Shunpei Honma, Tokutomi Sohō, Saneatsu Mushanokōji in 1942.Also, Kunihiko Hashida is involved as a representative of the Government of Japan.

The college was founded as a national policy for the rise of Asia tech. The purpose of the construction of the college was a contribution to the world culture and dissemination of engineering education to the people of Asia.

Kōa Institute of Technology took full-scale support from University of Tokyo, Tohoku University, Tokyo Institute of Technology as an educational institution to bring up the engineers who would lead a nation. Department of Industrial Engineering and materials management courses, aeronautical engineering, mechanical engineering has been installed at the university.

In 1944, the headquarters of the university was moved to  Sophia University in Kōjimachi from Tamagawa Gakuen. The metallurgy course work was relocated to the Kawasaki Heavy Industries factory yard in Kawasaki, Kanagawa in September.

The Kōjimachi and Kawasaki campus were destroyed during the April 13, 1945 and May 25 Tokyo air raids in World War II. The college was consigned to a class in the Tokyo Institute of Technology until 1946.

The college changed its name to Chiba Institute of Technology in 1946 and moved to the Kimitu campus. Four years later, it was moved to the present location.

On the educational philosophy of CIT  
 / Wikisource|興亞工業大學設立趣意書 
CIT was created as a base for the Asian cultural sphere to contribute to world culture. The educational goal of the university is to train engineers who contribute to world culture. Many Japanese universities offer education based on the traditional European educational philosophy, but CIT provides personnel education based on the Asian philosophy based on the Kitaro Nishida philosophy. Education at CIT is based on the policy of Progressive education from the very beginning, cherishing liberalism and individuality respect.

Campuses

1942～ 
Machida, Tokyo Campus (1942–46)
Chiyoda, Tokyo Campus (1943–45)
Kawasaki, Kanagawa Campus (1943–45)
Kimitu, Chiba Campus (1946–50)

1950～ 
Tsudanuma, Chiba Campus (1950-)
Tsudanuma Campus (English)
Chigusa, Chiba Campus (1967-)
Sibazono, Chiba Campus (1986-)
Sibazono Campus (English)

Schools and laboratories

Undergraduate schools
School of Engineering
Department of information science
Department of social system science

Graduate schools

Research laboratories
Future robot research center (furo)
future robot research center (English)
Planetary probe research center
planetary probe research center (Japanese)

People

Alumni 
Masayuki Uemura, a game engineer
Kazuki Akane, a Japanese director of Japanese animation.
Hiroshi Tachi, an actor (dropout)

Faculty
Susumu Tadakuma, professor emeritus
Kouji Hirato, part-time lecturer (1990-1998)

Exchange 
China
Harbin Institute of Technology
Jilin University
Beijing Institute of Technology
Sweden
Royal Institute of Technology
Canada
University of Toronto
The University of British Columbia
France
University of Technology of Compiègne
Poland
Warsaw University of Technology
Singapore
Singapore Institute of Manufacturing Technology
UK
King's College London
United States
University of Missouri-Rolla
Tennessee Technological University
The University of Alabama in Huntsville
The Pennsylvania State University
University of Colorado at Boulder
Japan
Chiba University
Chiba University of Commerce
Chiba Keizai University
Chuo Gakuin University
Kanda University of International Studies
Meikai University
Open University of Japan
Seitoku University
Shukutoku University
Tokyo University of Information Sciences
Wayo Women's University
Reitaku University
Vietnam
VNU University of Engineering and Technology

References

External links
 Official website 

Educational institutions established in 1942
Private universities and colleges in Japan
Universities and colleges in Chiba Prefecture
Engineering universities and colleges in Japan
1942 establishments in Japan